Trinitas Senior High School is a  Roman Catholic private high school located in Bandung, West Java, Indonesia. The school was founded in 1963 by the Sisters of Divine Providence under the local name SMA Trinitas Bandung.

Facilities 

In 2009, Trinitas Senior High School together with all the building in Indonesian CDP complex was upgraded and includes the following:
 Library
 Staff Room
 Canteen 
 Gymnasium
 Basketball court
 Language Laboratory
 Biology Laboratory
 Physics Laboratory
 Chemistry Laboratory
 Computer Laboratory
 Multimedia Room

Uniform 
Uniform worn before 2010:
National uniform (every Sunday and Thursday)
 Girl: white shirt, grey skirt, school badge, belt, pink school socks, black sneakers
 Boy: white shirt, grey pants, school badge, belt, green school socks, black sneakers

School uniform (every Tuesday, Wednesday, and Friday)
 Girl: white shirt, pink skirt, pink vest, school badge, belt, pink School socks, black sneakers
 Boy: white shirt, green pants, school belt, belt, green school socks, black sneakers

Saturday school uniform (every Saturday)
 Girl: black polo shirt or green T-Shirt, grey skirt, belt, pink school socks, shoes
 Boy: black polo shirt or green T-Shirt, grey pants, belt, pink school socks, shoes

Gym suit
 Girl: blue T-Shirt, navy blue bloomers, pink school socks, black sneakers
 Boy: blue T-Shirt, navy blue trousers, green school socks, black sneakers

Uniform worn by the generation after 2010: 
National uniform (every Sunday and Thursday)
 Girl: white shirt, grey skirt, school badge, belt, pink school socks, black sneakers 
 Boy: white shirt, grey pants, school badge, belt, green school socks, black sneakers

School uniform
 Girl: white shirt, tartan skirt in white, black, and pink, school badge, belt, white and pink school socks, black sneakers
 Boy: tartan shirt in white, black, and pink, white pants, school badge, belt, white and black school socks, black sneakers

Gym suit
Girl: blue T-shirt, navy blue bloomers, pink school socks, black sneakers
Boy: blue T-shirt, navy blue trousers, green school socks, black sneakers

Some changes in uniform:

References

External links
 2008 Trinitas SHS Yearbook

Catholic schools in Indonesia
Schools in Bandung
1963 establishments in Indonesia
Educational institutions established in 1963
Congregation of Divine Providence